Tioulong Saumura  (born 9 July 1950) is a Cambodian politician and financial analyst. She was a member of the Cambodia National Rescue Party and was elected to represent Phnom Penh in the National Assembly of Cambodia in 2003. She was also the Deputy Governor of Cambodia's Central Bank from 1993 to 1995.

Saumura was born in 1950 as one of the seven daughters of former prime minister Nhiek Tioulong and Lok Chumteav Measketh Samphotre. She and her six sisters passed much of their childhood outside of Cambodia, primarily in France, but also in Moscow, and Tokyo. While in France, she received a postgraduate degree in economics from the University of Paris in 1974. She subsequently attended the European Institute of Administration and earned a further degree in financial analysis. Like her husband, she holds French dual citizenship.

After the Cambodian Civil War, as the Vietnamese withdrew from Cambodia and the United Nations Transitional Authority in Cambodia began implementing the UN Settlement Plan, Saumura and her husband, opposition leader Sam Rainsy returned to Cambodia in 1992.

Her mother, Measketh Samphotre, died on 24 November 2016 at the age of 96.

On 16 November 2017, she was one of 118 senior CNRP party members banned from politics for five years.

References

 

1950 births
20th-century Cambodian women politicians
20th-century Cambodian politicians
21st-century Cambodian women politicians
21st-century Cambodian politicians
Living people
Cambodian politicians of Chinese descent
French people of Cambodian descent
French people of Chinese descent
French economists
French financial analysts
Members of the National Assembly (Cambodia)
Naturalized citizens of France
Cambodia National Rescue Party politicians
Cambodian emigrants to France
Cambodian democracy activists
Cambodian exiles
Candlelight Party politicians
People from Phnom Penh
INSEAD alumni
Sciences Po alumni
Children of prime ministers of Cambodia